Osoyoos Airport  is a regional airport in Osoyoos, British Columbia, a town in the Okanagan region of Canada. It is owned and operated by the town of Osoyoos, serving the South Okanagan, West Kootenays, and Boundary Country areas. The strip is a short paved runway, numbered 12–30. The airport has no facilities or services.

Facilities 
Taxi services are available, but there are no facilities or services offered at the airport itself.

See also

 List of airports in the Okanagan

References

External links 
 Official website

Registered aerodromes in British Columbia
Airports in the Okanagan
Regional District of Okanagan-Similkameen